Events in the year 2023 in Kazakhstan.

Incumbents

Events

Ongoing
 COVID-19 pandemic in Kazakhstan

January
14 January - 2023 Kazakh Senate election
15 February - Kazakh President Kassym-Jomart Tokayev signs a law annulling many privileges of his predecessor Nursultan Nazarbayev, including lifetime financial support from the state, the right to address the nation and propose ideas to officials, and deprives his immediate family of legal immunity.
Scheduled
2023 Kazakh legislative election

See also

 Outline of Kazakhstan
 Index of Kazakhstan-related articles
 List of Kazakhstan-related topics
 History of Kazakhstan
 List of Kazakhs
 List of Kazakh khans

References

External links
 Kazakhstan Country Profile; CIA World Fact Book
 Kazakhstan; United Nations Statistics Division

 
2020s in Kazakhstan
Years of the 21st century in Kazakhstan
Kazakhstan
Kazakhstan